Fanucci Editore  is an Italian publishing house, based in Rome, Italy, founded in July 1971, by Renato Fanucci. It publishes mainly science fiction, horror and fantasy, notably it has published the Italian editions of Philip K. Dick books for whom owns the exclusive rights for Italy.

References

External links 
Official website

Publishing companies of Italy
Companies based in Rome